Willie White (born August 20, 1962) is an American former National Basketball Association (NBA) player. After graduating from Carver High in Memphis, White attended the University of Tennessee at Chattanooga (UTC). In his freshman season, he averaged 11.8 points per game. UTC also won the Southern Conference championship and made their first NCAA Division I men's basketball tournament appearance. In Willie's sophomore season at UTC, he averaged 15.8 points per game, leading UTC to a second consecutive Southern Conference championship. Willie averaged 18.4 points per game his junior season, also leading UTC to a third straight Southern Conference championship. This was good enough for Willie to be named the Southern Conference Men's Basketball Player of the Year. He averaged 18 points a game his senior season, but lost in the Southern Conference Championship game in double overtime to Marshall.  White was invited to the U.S. Olympic team trials in Bloomington, Indiana in 1984.  Willie was drafted with eighteenth pick in the second round of the 1984 NBA draft by the Denver Nuggets. In Willie's two seasons with the Nuggets, he averaged 3.7 points, 1 rebound and 1 assist per game.

References

1962 births
Living people
African-American basketball players
Alumni of George Washington Carver High School (Memphis, Tennessee)
American expatriate basketball people in the Philippines
American men's basketball players
Basketball players from Memphis, Tennessee
Chattanooga Mocs men's basketball players
Denver Nuggets draft picks
Denver Nuggets players
Magnolia Hotshots players
Philippine Basketball Association imports
Shooting guards
21st-century African-American people
20th-century African-American sportspeople